Moose Point State Park is a day-use public recreation area overlooking Penobscot Bay in Searsport,  Maine, located off U.S. Route 1 near the Belfast town line. The state park features panoramic views, hiking trails, tidal pools, and picnicking facilities.

History
The park was developed as a dairy farm by the Carver family in 1859. At one point, the 186-acre property had a house, barn, two silos, and sixty head of cattle. After most of the buildings burned down in 1927, the descendants of Captain George A. Carver offered the land to the State of Maine as a park in 1952. It opened in 1963.

Gallery

References

External links

Moose Point State Park Department of Agriculture, Conservation and Forestry
Moose Point State Park Guide Department of Agriculture, Conservation and Forestry

Protected areas of Waldo County, Maine
State parks of Maine
Searsport, Maine